Tazehabad-e Doktor Vase (also Romanized as Tāzehābād-e Doktor Vāse‘; also known as Tāzehābād) is a village in Hoseynabad-e Jonubi Rural District, in the Central District of Sanandaj County, Kurdistan Province, Iran. At the 2006 census, its population was 33, in 8 families. The village is populated by Kurds.

References 

Towns and villages in Sanandaj County
Kurdish settlements in Kurdistan Province